Delbert "Treetop" Fowler (born May 4, 1958) is a former American football player for the Winnipeg Blue Bombers of the Canadian Football League. Fowler was born in Cleveland, Ohio where he played high school football for Glenville High School in Cleveland, Ohio.

After high school, Fowler attended West Virginia University where he played for the Mountaineers. He played between 1977 and 1980 as a defensive end. After retiring from professional football he married Gail Jones of Pittsburgh, Pa. To this union was born one son, Delbert DeVaughn "Booter" Fowler.

Fowler was drafted out of college in the 1981 NFL draft by the Houston Oilers. He was the fifth round, twenty-second pick.

References

1958 births
Living people
Players of American football from Cleveland
Canadian football linebackers
Winnipeg Blue Bombers players
Montreal Concordes players
West Virginia Mountaineers football players